Adilet Kyshtakbekov (also Kyshtabekov, born 11 April 1993) is a runner from Kyrgyzstan who competed internationally over distances from 800 m to marathon. He won a bronze medal in the 10,000 m at the 2017 Asian Championships and placed 10th in the 1500 m at the 2014 Asian Games and 14th in the marathon at the 2018 Asian Games.

Kyshtakbekov took up athletics in 2005 following his father.

References

Kyrgyzstani male long-distance runners
Kyrgyzstani male middle-distance runners
1993 births
Living people
Athletes (track and field) at the 2014 Asian Games
Athletes (track and field) at the 2018 Asian Games
Asian Games competitors for Kyrgyzstan
Kyrgyz Technical University alumni